OU-PRIME (Polarimetric Radar for Innovations in Meteorology and Engineering) was an advanced Doppler weather radar. It was completed in January 2009 after a ten-month construction period and commissioned on April 4, 2009. It is operated by the Advanced Radar Research Center (ARRC) at the University of Oklahoma (OU). The radar was manufactured by Enterprise Electronics Corporation to provide OU students and faculty a platform for research and education in the field of radar meteorology.  This C-band polarimetric radar has some of the highest resolution data of any C-band weather radar in the United States.

OU-PRIME was struck by lightning on 19 March 2012 around 9:20am local time. Since then, the radar has not been operated due to damage.

System characteristics 
OU-PRIME, aka OU', is located on the Research Campus of the University of Oklahoma within walking distance of the National Weather Center building.  Through a unique design, OU-PRIME can provide real-time time-series data providing opportunities for rapid developments in radar signal processing algorithms.  Because of its C-band wavelength and 1 MW transmit power, OU-PRIME is extremely sensitive to clouds with approximately 10 dB more sensitivity over the NEXRAD system (S-band).

Characteristics:
 Location 
 Radiating Center Height is 80 feet (24.4 m)
 Operating frequency: 5510 MHz (C-band)
 Wavelength: 5.44 cm
 Pulse Length: 0.4, 0.8, 1.0, 2.0 µs
 Pulse Repetition Frequency: 300–2000 Hz, 1 Hz step
 1 MW Peak Power (magnetron with solid-state modulator)
 8.5-meter Andrew precision C-band dish
 High angular resolution: 0.45 degrees @ -3 dB points
 Gain: 50 dBi
 Sidelobe Level: Better than -26 dB one-way
 Cross-Pol: Better than -30 dB
 Rotation rate: 6-25 deg/s under typical scanning (30 deg/s max)
 Minimum Detectable Signal: -112 dBm
 Radar Sensitivity: -15 dBZ at 50 km
 Noise Figure: 3 dB
 Simultaneous dual-polarization
 Flexible computing platform for real-time algorithm development
 Real-time I/Q data recording/processing
 A/D converter resolution: 16 bit
 Receiver bandwidth: 6 MHz
 Gate spacing: 25–500 m
 Number of range gates: up to 2200
 Clutter suppression: 60 dB (automatic detection/suppression using CLEAN-AP )
 Advanced signal processing framework based on new STEP algorithm, including clutter estimation/suppression and multi-lag moment estimation

Research and educational pursuits 

 An integral part of OU's Weather Radar Curriculum
 Non-precipitating cloud studies
 Advanced signal processing algorithm development (e.g. Doppler spectrum)
 Weather radar polarimetry / QPE
 Next-generation digital receiver design
 Severe weather detection algorithms based on spectral processing
 Precipitation microphysics
 Radar-based aerobiology
 Adaptive real-time processing
 Cloud physics and electrification
 Storm dynamics

External links

 OU-PRIME website & real-time display
 ARRC website
 University of Oklahoma website
 University of Oklahoma opens student access to advanced weather radar, Tulsa World, April 2009.
New weather radar unveiled at Univ. of Oklahoma, USA TODAY, April 2009.
 Enterprise Electronics Corporation

References

Weather radars
University of Oklahoma campus